Sicilian Avenue  is a pedestrian shopping parade in Bloomsbury, London, resembling an open air arcade, that diagonally runs in between Southampton Row and Bloomsbury Way. It was constructed due to land clearance for a road widening project next to the avenue.

The street was designed by the architect Robert Worley in 1906 (completed in 1910) in a monumental Edwardian style, using Italian marble throughout, colonnades and turrets.

The place is well-preserved, and has a number of shops, pavement cafés and restaurants.

Above the commercial activities located on the ground floor, five storeys buildings decorated with terracotta bands are occupied by offices (formerly flats). Ionic columns on plinths, carrying the street name in gold characters, have been placed at both the eastern and western entrances of the avenue.

Several scenes of the 2018 film The Guernsey Literary and Potato Peel Pie Society were filmed in Sicilian Avenue, as was a scene from the 2017 film Wonder Woman.

1–29, 6–20, 25–35 and 35A are listed Grade II on the National Heritage List for England. The three lamp posts on Sicilian Avenue are also listed Grade II.

See also
Woburn Walk
Piccadilly Arcade
Royal Arcade, London
Burlington Arcade
Leadenhall Market

References

Streets in the London Borough of Camden
Bloomsbury
1910 establishments in England
Grade II listed buildings in the London Borough of Camden